Northern Crusades is a 1972 Lithuanian SSR drama film directed by Marijonas Giedrys.

Cast 
 Antanas Šurna – Herkus Monte (Herkus Mantas)
 Eugenija Pleškytė – Catherine (Kotryna)
 Algimantas Masiulis – Samilis 
 Stasys Petronaitis – Koltis 
  – Auctume (Auktuma)
  – Glappo (Glapas)
 Aleksandr Vokach – knight Hirhalsas, brother of Catherine
 Vytautas Paukštė – bishop (vyskupas)

References

External links 

1972 drama films
1972 films
Soviet drama films
Northern Crusades films
Films set in the 13th century
Lithuanian drama films
Soviet-era Lithuanian films